Tamil Nadu Day also referred to as Tamil Nadu Dhinam in Tamil. It is celebrated in the South Indian state of Tamil Nadu to commemorate the formation of the state. Tamil Nadu was created on 1 November 1956 with the name Madras State. On 18 July 1967, Madras State was officially renamed to Tamil Nadu.

History 
After Indian Independence on 15 August 1947, the Madras Presidency became the Madras Province. On 26 January 1950,India became republic it was formed as Madras State by the Government of India.

At the time of its formation in 1950, it included the whole of present-day Tamil Nadu, Coastal Andhra, Rayalaseema, the Malabar region of North Kerala and Bellary of South Canara. Coastal Andhra and Rayalaseema were separated to form Andhra State in 1953, while South Canara and Bellary districts were merged with Mysore State, and Malabar District with the State of Travancore-Cochin to form Kerala in 1956.

As a result of the States Reorganisation Act, 1956, the state's boundaries were re-organized following linguistic lines. The Tamil speaking region Kanyakumari was merged to Madras state which was earlier a part of Travancore-Cochin.

In 1967, all the political parties of Madras State spoke in one voice on their demand to rename the state as Tamil Nadu. A resolution was passed unanimously in the Madras State Legislative Assembly by the government led by the then chief minister of Tamil Nadu C. N. Annadurai seeking to rename the state as Tamil Nadu.

On 18 July 1967, the state was officially renamed from Madras State to Tamil Nadu.

In 2019,five decades after the state was renamed, the Government of Tamil Nadu led by the then chief minister of Tamil Nadu Edapadi K Palaniswami, announced that 1 November of every year will be celebrated as Tamil Nadu Day from 2019 to mark the formation of the state.

In July 2022,Government of Tamil Nadu led by the then chief minister of Tamil Nadu M.K.Stalin, announced that 18 July of every year will be celebrated as Tamil Nadu Day from 2022 to mark the formation of the state.

References

Culture of Tamil Nadu
November observances
Indian state foundation days